The  was a series of 30 Bakumatsu period coastal artillery battery sites erected by Obama Domain on the Sea of Japan coast along what is now the coasts of the city of Obama and town of Ōi in the Hokuriku region of northern Japan. The ruins of these fortifications were collectively designated a National Historic Site in 2001.

Background
In the late Edo period, the Tokugawa shogunate was increasing alarmed by incursions by foreign ships into Japanese territorial waters, fearing that these kurofune warships of the United States or other Western powers would attempt the end Japanese self-imposed national isolation policy by force, or would attempt an invasion of Japan by landing hostile military forces. Numerous feudal domains were ordered to establish fortifications along their coastlines with shore artillery located at strategic locations. The most powerful daimyō of Echizen Domain, Matsudaira Yoshinaga was at the time a hard-line supporter of the sonnō jōi movement, and quickly responded by 26 cannons in several batteries along his coastline in 1848. In neighboring Wakasa Province, the Sakai clan of Obama Domain was quick to emulate this example, completing these batteries in 1854, the year after the arrival of the Perry Expedition at Uraga.

Matsugase Battery
The  was a pair of batteries at the entrance to Obama Bay intended to defend the port against a possible attack. Matsugase No.1 Battery faced the entrance to the bay, and had five cannons in a row, behind an earthen rampart which extended for 50 meters. The rampart was in the form of a redan with an open back. The rampart had openings for five cannon. The rampart was also in the form of a redan with an open back. The rampart had an opening for one cannon, which was mounted on a swivel mount, and two square turrets for fixed cannons on either side. At the ends of both earthworks are traces of an ammunition depot. The site is located within the grounds of a public campground, and replica cannon have been installed.

Nokogirizaki Battery
It consists of five box-shaped ramparts with open rears, surrounding two box-shaped ramparts in the centre. As the site is within the grounds of the Ōi Nuclear Power Plant, public access is prohibited.

Kawasaki Battery
The   was built in 1854 and consists of seven locations in the inner bay close to Obama Castle, with mountings for a total of 55 cannon.

Gallery

See also
List of Historic Sites of Japan (Fukui)

References

External links

Cultural Properties of Fukui Prefecture 
Oi Town official home page

Bakumatsu
History of Fukui Prefecture
Obama, Fukui
Ōi, Fukui
Wakasa Province
Coastal artillery
Historic Sites of Japan
19th-century fortifications in Japan